Melolonthini is a tribe of scarab beetles in the family Scarabaeidae. There are over 250 genera in Melolonthini, occurring worldwide; there are over 300 species in North America alone, and more than 3000 worldwide.

Selected genera
Amblonoxia Reitter, 1902 (dusty June beetles)
Amphimallon Latreille, 1825 (European chafers)
Anoxia Laporte, 1832
Brahmina Blanchard, 1850
Dinacoma Casey, 1889
Fossocarus Howden, 1961
Gronocarus Howden, 1968
Holotrichia Hope, 1837
Hypotrichia LeConte, 1861
Lasiopsis Erichson, 1847
Lepidiota Kirby, 1828
Leucopholis Dejean, 1833
Melolontha Fabricius, 1775 (cockchafers)
Miridiba Reitter, 1901
Phyllophaga Harris, 1827 (May beetles)
Plectrodes Horn, 1867
Polyphylla Harris, 1841 (lined June beetles)
Rhizotrogus Lepeletier & Serville, 1825
Thyce LeConte, 1856

References

 Bouchard, P., Y. Bousquet, A. Davies, M. Alonso-Zarazaga, J. Lawrence, C. Lyal, A. Newton, et al. (2011). "Family-group names in Coleoptera (Insecta)". ZooKeys, vol. 88, 1–972.

Further reading

 Arnett, R. H. Jr., M. C. Thomas, P. E. Skelley and J. H. Frank. (eds.). (21 June 2002). American Beetles, Volume II: Polyphaga: Scarabaeoidea through Curculionoidea. CRC Press LLC, Boca Raton, Florida .
 
 Richard E. White. (1983). Peterson Field Guides: Beetles. Houghton Mifflin Company.

Melolonthinae